Livsforsikringsselskapet Idun was a Norwegian insurance company.

It was founded in 1861. The first chief executive was Jørgen Gjerdrum. Idun was incorporated into Storebrand in the 1970s. The current CFO is Anne Barfod, and she leads the Board.

References

Insurance companies of Norway
Financial services companies established in 1861
1861 establishments in Norway
Companies disestablished in the 1970s
Companies based in Oslo
Norwegian companies established in 1861
Defunct companies of Norway